The women's triathlon was part of the Triathlon at the 2015 European Games program, was held in Bilgah Beach Triathlon Venue on June 14, 2015.

The race was held over the "international distance" and consisted of  swimming,  road bicycle racing, and  road running.

Schedule
All times are Azerbaijan Standard Time (UTC+04:00)

Results 
Legend
DNF – did not finish
LAP – lapped
DNS – did not start

References 

Triathlon at the 2015 European Games
2015 in women's sport